Hupp may refer to:

Hupp (surname)
 Hupp, former name of DeSabla, California
 The Hupp Motor Car Company
Hupp House, historic house in Strasburg, Virginia